"Massacre at Sand Creek" was an American television film broadcast on December 27, 1956, as part of the CBS television series, Playhouse 90. It was the 13th episode of the first season.

Plot
The film tells a story of the Sand Creek massacre, an 1864 massacre of Cheyenne and Arapaho people by the U.S. Army.

Cast
The cast included performances by:

Everett Sloane as Col. John Templeton
John Derek at 2nd Lt. Norman Tucker
Gene Evans as 1st Sgt. Maddox
Roy Roberts as Col. Collery
 Ken Mayer as Major Downing
William Schallert as Defense Attorney 
 Haim Winant as Free Horse
 Marshall Bradford as Presiding Officer
 Rick Vallin as Henshaw
 Ben Wright as Prosecuting Attorney
 Michael Granger as Little River
 Anthony Lawrence as Reed
 William Bryant as Calhoun

Production
Arthur Hiller was the director in his first production for Playhouse 90. William Sackheim was the producer and also wrote the teleplay. Ray Cory was the director of photography, and Henry Batista was the editor. The film was produced by Screen Gems for Playhouse 90. It was the third Playhouse 90 film produced by Screen Gems.

Steve Drumm, a Blackfoot Indian, served as the makeup and hair expert for the actors playing the parts of the Indians. He was in charge of ensuring the use of authentic haircuts, applying war paint, and overseeing scalpings.

The production used approximately 75 horses. Actor John Derek emphasized the importance of the horses: "Any western star is only as good as his horse. Put a dashing hero on a drooping, plodding horse and even the most cityfied youngster would pelt the television screen . . . A spirited, prancing hunk of horseflesh is as necessary as the camera."

Reception
Donald Kirkley in The Baltimore Sun criticized the film for its historical "changes and inventions." In addition to changing the villain's name from Chivington to Templeton, Kirkley noted that the production radically altered the details of the massacre as well as the motive. The real Chivington, wrote Kirkley, was a former minister motivated by a fervent belief that Indians "were no better than wild beasts, to be exterminated when found." The script changed the fictional Templeton's motive to one of personal ambition.

References

External links

1956 American television episodes
Playhouse 90 (season 1) episodes
1956 television plays